"Guess I Went Crazy" is a single by Canadian country music group Canadian Zephyr. Released in 1980, it was a single from their album Zephyr. The song reached number one on the RPM Country Tracks chart in Canada in October 1980.

Charts

References

1980 singles
Canadian Zephyr songs
1980 songs
Song articles with missing songwriters